The Sayyid dynasty was the fourth dynasty of the Delhi Sultanate, with four rulers ruling from 1414 to 1451, as a vassal of the Timurid Empire.Founded by Khizr Khan, the Tughlaq and Timurid governor of Multan, they succeeded the Tughlaq dynasty until they were displaced by the Lodi dynasty.

Origins

A contemporary writer Yahya Sirhindi mentions in his Takhrikh-i-Mubarak Shahi that Khizr Khan was a descendant of prophet Muhammad. Members of the dynasty derived their title, Sayyid, or the descendants of the Islamic prophet, Muhammad, based on the claim that they belonged to his lineage through his daughter Fatima. However, Yahya Sirhindi based his conclusions on meagre and unsubstantial evidence, the first being a casual recognition by the famous Punjabi saint Sayyid Jalaluddin Bukhari of Uch Sharif of his Sayyid heritage, and the second being the Sultan's noble character which distinguished him as posessing the moral qualities of a Prophet's descendant. Sirhindi does not even attempt to provide a geneaology, which he could have easily concocted if he wanted to make the claim more legitimate. According to Saxena, this was likely because such an attempt would not have deceived Khizr Khan's contemporaries. Abraham Eraly and Surendra Nath Sen are of the opinion that Khizr Khan's ancestors might have been descendents of an Arab family who had long ago settled in region of Multan  during the early Tughluq period, but both doubt his Sayyid lineage.

According to Richard M. Eaton and oriental scholar Simon Digby Khizr Khan was a Punjabi chieftain belonging to the Khokhar clan, who was sent to Timur as an ambassador and negotiator from the most adjacent area, the Punjab, ultimately became the power holder in Delhi, thanks to the contacts he had aquired. This view is echoed by Francesca Orsini and Samira Sheikh in their work. Jaswant Lal Mehta describes Khizr Khan as a leading noble, doubting his Sayyid heritage and instead assuming he belonged to family of Multan with Arab ancestry and who ruled Delhi as the viceroy of Timur. Khizr Khan's native town was Fathpur in Punjab (present-day Pakistan) which also served as the capital of his sultanate before being made viceroy of Delhi by Timur.

History

Following Timur's 1398 Sack of Delhi, he appointed Khizr Khan as deputy of Multan (Punjab). He held Lahore, Dipalpur, Multan and Upper Sindh. Khizr Khan captured Delhi on 28 May 1414 thereby establishing the Sayyid dynasty. Khizr Khan did not take up the title of Sultan, but continued the fiction of his allegiance to Timur as Rayat-i-Ala(vassal) of the Timurids - initially that of Timur, and later his son Shah Rukh. After the accession of Khizr Khan, the Punjab, Uttar Pradesh and Sindh were reunited under the Delhi Sultanate, where he spent his time subduing rebellions. Punjab was the powerbase of Khizr Khan and his successors as the bulk of the Delhi army during their reigns came from Multan and Dipalpur. 

Khizr Khan was succeeded by his son Sayyid Mubarak Shah after his death on 20 May 1421. Mubarak Shah referred to himself as Muizz-ud-Din Mubarak Shah on his coins, removing the Timurid name with the name of the Caliph, and declared himself a Shah. A detailed account of his reign is available in the Tarikh-i-Mubarak Shahi written by Yahya-bin-Ahmad Sirhindi. After the death of Mubarak Shah, his nephew, Muhammad Shah ascended the throne and styled himself as Sultan Muhammad Shah. Just before his death, he called his son Sayyid Ala-ud-Din Shah from Badaun, and nominated him as successor.

The last ruler of the Sayyids, Ala-ud-Din, voluntarily abdicated the throne of the Delhi Sultanate in favour of Bahlul Khan Lodi on 19 April 1451, and left for Badaun, where he died in 1478.

Kings

Khizr Khan

Khizr Khan was the governor of Multan under Firuz Shah Tughlaq. When Timur invaded India, Khizr Khan, a Sayyid from Multan joined him. Timur appointed him the governor of Multan and Lahore. He then conquered the city of Delhi and started the rule of the Sayyids in 1414. He was ruling in the name of Timur. He could not assume an independent position in all respects. As a mark of recognition of the suzerainty of the Timurids, the name of the Timurid ruler (Shah Rukh) was recited in the khutba but as an interesting innovation, the name of Khizr Khan was also attached to it. But strangely enough, the name of the Timurid ruler was not inscribed on the coins and the name of the old Tughlaq sultan continued on the currency. No coins are known in the name of Khizr Khan.

Mubarak Shah

Mubarak Shah was the son of Khizr Khan, who ascended the throne in the year 1421. Mubarak Shah discontinued his father's nominal allegiance to Timur. He freely used the royal title of Shah along with his own name, and professed allegiance to the Khalifah alone. He was the ablest ruler of the Sayyid dynasty. He defeated the advancing Hoshang Shah Ghori, ruler of Malwa Sultanate and forced him to pay heavy tribute early in his reign Mubarak Shah also put down the rebellion of Jasrath Khokhar and managed to fend off multiple invasions by Timurids of Kabul.

Muhammad Shah

Muhammad Shah was a nephew of Mubarak Shah. He ruled from 1434 to 1443. Muhammad Shah acceded to the throne with the help of Sarwar ul Mulk. After that Shah wanted to free himself from the domination of Sarwar ul Mulk with the help of his faithful vizier Kamal ul Mulk. His reign was marked by many rebellions and conspiracies, and he died in the year. Multan became independent under the Langahs during his rule.

Alam Shah
The last ruler of the Sayyid dynasty, Alauddin Alam Shah was defeated by Bahlol Lodi, who started the Lodi dynasty.

See also

 List of Sunni Muslim dynasties
 Persianate states
 Saadat-e-Bara
 Sadaat-e-Bilgram

References

Sources

External links
Encyclopædia Britannica - Sayyid dynasty
Coin Gallery - Sayyid dynasty

 
Delhi Sultanate
1414 establishments in Asia
15th-century establishments in India
1451 disestablishments in Asia
15th-century disestablishments in India
Arab dynasties